Vice Admiral John Knowles Im Thurn,  (7 March 1881 – 5 July 1956) was a British Royal Navy officer who was Assistant Chief of the Naval Staff from 1931 to 1933.

Biography
Im Thurn joined the Royal Navy in January 1895, and was promoted to the rank of lieutenant on 15 January 1902. In August that year he was posted to the torpedo boat depot ship , serving with the Mediterranean Fleet. He served in the First World War, mainly with wireless telegraph and signalling duties, and was promoted to the rank of captain on 30 June 1918. After the war he held several staff appointments, as Assistant Director of Electrical Torpedo and Mining until 1920, then Director of the Signal Department until 1921.

In March 1931 he was appointed Assistant Chief of the Naval Staff, a senior appointment in the Royal Navy. He served in this position until 1933, when he was appointed commanding officer of the 1st Cruiser Squadron in the Mediterranean Fleet.

He was promoted to vice-admiral in January 1935, and retired from service later the same year.

Family
Im Thurn was married to Margaret Elizabeth Flemming.

References

External links
http://www.hmshood.com/crew/biography/imthurn_bio.htm
 

1881 births
1956 deaths
Royal Navy vice admirals
Companions of the Order of the Bath
Companions of the Order of St Michael and St George
Commanders of the Order of the British Empire